Broadwindsor is a village and civil parish in the county of Dorset in South West England. Broadwindsor was formerly a liberty, containing only the parish itself. Dorset County Council estimate that in 2013 the population of the civil parish was 1,320. In the 2011 census the population of the parish, combined with that of the small parish of Seaborough to the north, was 1,378.

The parish church is principally Perpendicular in style, though it has origins in the 12th and 13th centuries, and was rebuilt in 1868. Thomas Fuller, who wrote The Worthies of England and The History of the Holy Warre, preached here between 1634 and 1650.

King Charles II stayed the night in the village on 23 September 1651, after his flight from the Battle of Worcester.

See also
List of liberties in Dorset.

References

External links 
Broadwindsor.org - launched at the start of Covid 2020 to keep the rural community informed of the ever changing rules - this is now the most informative and up to date village website run by an individual.

Villages in Dorset
Liberties of Dorset

https://broadwindsor.org